Almost all media in the Abitibi-Témiscamingue region of Quebec serves all cities in the region, with very little differentiation between the three primary cities of Rouyn-Noranda, Val-d'Or, and Amos.

Although the cities of Rouyn-Noranda and Val-d'Or are far enough apart that radio and television stations in the area serve the cities from separate transmitters, almost every broadcast station in either city has a rebroadcaster in the other city. The only nominal exceptions are the cities' separate Énergie stations, although at present even these stations share the majority of their broadcast schedule. While Amos is the official city of license for some of the rebroadcasters, only one radio station originates in that city, and all transmitters licensed to either Amos or Val-d'Or encompass both cities within their broadcast range.

Radio

Television

The region was previously served by a local Ici Radio-Canada Télé affiliate CKRN-DT, which broadcast on channel 4 in Rouyn-Noranda, with additional repeaters throughout the region; the station broadcast from 1957 to 2018.

In Rouyn-Noranda, Val-d'Or and Malartic, cable television is provided by Cablevision, a subsidiary of Bell Aliant. The region's community channel on Cablevision is branded TVC9.

Newspapers
 La Dépêche 
 Le Citoyen 
 La Frontière

References

Abitibi-Temiscamingue
Media, Abitibi-Temiscamingue